Cecilia Arboleda de Holguín (born Cecilia Arboleda Mosquera; 21 January 1859 - 3 February 1924), was the wife of Jorge Holguín, 15th President of Colombia.

Personal life
Cecilia was born in Paris on 21 January 1859. She was the daughter of the politician and poet Julio Arboleda Pombo and his wife Sofía Mosquera Hurtado.

She married the Cauca politician Jorge Holguín Mallarino on 9 August 1877. She died on 3 February 1924 at the age of 65.

References

1859 births
1924 deaths
First ladies of Colombia
People from Cauca Department
People from Paris